Bradley Thomas may refer to:

 Brad Thomas (baseball) (born 1977), Australian baseball player
 Brad Thomas (cricketer) (born 1972), Australian cricket player
 Bradley Thomas (athlete) (born 1967), Australian Paralympic
 Bradley Thomas (footballer) (born 1984), English footballer
 Brad Thomas (politician), American politician

See also